The Amis Folk Center is a cultural center in Chenggong Township, Taitung County, Taiwan about Amis people.

History
The center was opened in November 1995.

Architecture
The center has an area of around 2 hectares in size. The main building of family and festival houses are based on the hand drawings of Guangfu Township in Hualien County from 1943 by a Japanese ethnologist. The buildings are the imitation of Shaman's house in Taibalang community in Hualien County. The center has an outdoor performance square and an outlook that can hold 2,000 people at one time.

Transportation
The center is accessible by bus from Hualien Station or Taitung Station of Taiwan Railways.

See also
 List of tourist attractions in Taiwan

References

1995 establishments in Taiwan
Amis people
Buildings and structures in Taitung County
Cultural centers in Taiwan
Tourist attractions in Taitung County